A language observatory is something which is built or implemented to observe and measure language activities in society.

The need for observatories
According to the UNESCO report "Atlas of the World Languages in Danger of Disappearing", between 6,000 and 7,000 languages are spoken throughout the world and, that many more have become extinct. Concerns regarding content online have been expressed. Another UNESCO document, "Recommendation concerning the Promotion and Use of Multilingualism and Universal Access to Cyberspace" noted in its preamble that "linguistic diversity in the global information networks and universal access to information in cyberspace are at the core of contemporary debates and can be a determining factor in the development of a knowledge-based society", and recommended that UNESCO establish "a collaborative online observatory on existing policies, regulations, technical recommendations, and best practices relating to multilingualism and multilingual resources and applications, including innovations in language computerization."  In 2018, was created the UNESCO Chair Language Policies for Multilingualism as a research network to generate knowledge on the different contexts of multilingualism so to help the development of UNESCO policies, such as the Promotion of Multilingualism in Cyberspace, and the development of the UNESCO Atlas of the World Languages.

Language observatories in the world

Several language observatory activities and projects have already emerged in various parts of the world, such as Language Observatory, and UNESCO Observatory on the Information Society, which has a section focusing on Cultural Diversity and Multilingualism. One observatory which dedicated to indicators of the space of languages in the Internet, "The Observatory of linguistic and cultural diversity on the Internet " was active between 1998 and 2009 and regained activity in 2017, updating since then and yearly indicators for 329 languages.

References
Measuring Linguistic Diversity on the Internet, edited with an introduction by UNESCO Institute for Statistics, Montreal Canada, UNESCO, 2005. French version is also available.
The Language Observatory Project, Mikami, Y., Zavarsky Pavol, Mohd Zaidi Abd Rozan, Izumi Suzuki, Masayuki Takahashi, Tomohide Maki, Irwan Nizan Ayob, Massimo Santini, Paolo Boldi, Sebastiano Vigna, In Poster Proceedings of the Fourteenth International World Wide Web Conference (WWW2005). pp. 990–991,10–14 May 2005, Chiba, JAPAN. 
Twelve years of measuring linguistic diversity in the Internet: balance and perspectives, Pimienta D., Prado D., Blanco A., UNESCO Publications for the World Summit on the Information Society, 2009. French version is also available.
Resource: Indicators on the Presence of Languages in Internet, Pimienta D., Proceedings of the 1st Annual Meeting of the ELRA/ISCA Special Interest Group on Under-Resourced Languages, 2022.  French, Spanish and Portuguese versions are also available.

Linguistic research
Endangered languages
Sociolinguistics